College Hill is a residential neighborhood of Cincinnati, Ohio. Originally a wealthy suburb called Pleasant Hill due to its prime location, it was renamed College Hill because of the two colleges that were established there in the mid-nineteenth century. The neighborhood is not to be confused with North College Hill, which borders College Hill to the north but is not part of Cincinnati. The population was 16,039 at the 2020 census.

History
Cary built a log cabin and moved his family to this “wilderness,” then known as Mill Creek Township. In 1833, Cary's son Freeman G. Cary established Pleasant Hill Academy for boys on part of his land. The academy became an agricultural school called Farmer's College (for which the area was renamed) in 1846. That school became Belmont College in 1885, and then formed the core of the Ohio Military Institute in 1890. A separate school, the Ohio Female College, was founded in 1852 by Reverend John Covert and operated until 1873 when it was sold to build the Cincinnati Sanitarium, the first private US psychiatric facility not on the East Coast.

The development of the area was expedited by the introduction of a railroad line in 1851 and horsecar service in the 1860s. College Hill was incorporated as a village in 1866, then annexed to the city of Cincinnati in stages in 1911, 1915 and 1923.

The town was the birthplace of Samuel Fenton Cary and still features several historic buildings, including Laurel Court, College Hill Town Hall and the Old College Hill Post Office.

Demographics

Notable people
 John E. Bruce, former mayor
 Cornelia Laws St. John (died 1902), poet

Gallery

References

External links
 College Hill Community website 

Neighborhoods in Cincinnati
Former municipalities in Ohio
1866 establishments in Ohio